The People's Palace is a Grade II listed building in Mile End in the London Borough of Tower Hamlets. It is home to the Great Hall, a large theatre and entertainment venue, and is now part of Queen Mary University of London.

History 

The original People's Palace was built on the site of what is now the Queens' Building, and was opened in 1887. It was destroyed by a fire in 1931, and a new People's Palace was built on the current site, immediately adjacent to the former. It was opened by King George VI on 13 February 1937, in what was his first public engagement as king.

The People's Palace was acquired by Queen Mary College in 1954.

See also
People's Palace, other organisations with the same name

References

External links 

 The People's Palace – Home of the Great Hall – Queen Mary Venues
 New People's Palace – Theatres Trust

Queen Mary University of London
Grade II listed buildings in the London Borough of Tower Hamlets
Mile End
Art Deco architecture in London